The Bisagno  (in Ligurian Besagno ) is a  river in Liguria, (Italy).

Geography 

The river rises near Scoffera pass at around 600 m in the Ligurian Apennines. It flows south-west in the Bisagno Valley and receives its two main tributaries, called torrente Lentro (from the left hand) and torrente Canate (from the right hand). Heading south it reaches Genova and ends its course in the Ligurian Sea. The last part of its course, from Genova Brignole railway station to the mouth, has been transformed in a water tunnel.

Bisagno basin (95 km2) is totally included in the Province of Genova.

Main tributaries 
 Left hand:
 torrente Lentro, 
 rio Montesignano,
 rio Fereggiano.
 Right hand:
 torrente Canate, 
 rio Torbido,
 torrente Geirato
 rio Trensasco,
 rio Cicala,
 rio Veilino.

History 
The Département du Bisagne o Dipartimento del Bisagno of Ligurian Republic took its name at the end of the 18th century from the stream.

See also

 List of rivers of Italy

References

External links
 

Rivers of the Province of Genoa
Rivers of the Apennines
Drainage basins of the Ligurian Sea
Metropolitan City of Genoa
Rivers of Liguria
Rivers of Italy